Break is a 2020 British independent film. Written and directed by Michael Elkin, it stars Sam Gittins, Jamie Foreman, Adam Deacon, Terri Dwyer, David Yip and Rutger Hauer in one of his final screen roles. Snooker player cameos include Liang Wenbo,  Jack Lisowski and 1997 World Snooker Championship winner Ken Doherty.

Plot
A young snooker player is helped by a local gangster and a veteran Chinese pool champion to break free from a world of crime and reach the glittering lights of Beijing to play in a prestigious Chinese snooker tournament that could save his life. It has been described as "Rocky with a snooker cue".

Cast 
 Sam Gittins as Spencer
 Rutger Hauer as Ray
 Jamie Foreman as Monty
 Terri Dwyer as Cathy Pryde
 Luke Mably as Terry Pryde
 Sophie Stevens as Shelley
 David Yip as Qiang
 Adam Deacon as "Weasel"
 Mark Homer as Prison Officer Yates
 Charlie Wernham as Wallis
 Jack Lisowski as himself 
 Ken Doherty as himself
 Liang Wenbo as himself

Production
Filmed at locations including the Crucible Theatre in Sheffield, Beijing and Canterbury Prison in Kent.

Release
Although originally intended to be released in April 2020, it became the first UK movie to premiere via Drive-in when, during the COVID-19 pandemic, it was released to coincide with the delayed 2020 World Snooker Championship. The premiere was held on 22 July 2020 at Brent Cross Drive-In Club in North London, the first premiere of its kind.

Reception
The feature length film debut by Elkin was described as "impressive" by Reviews Hub in which he "throws all the sports film clichés up in the air and rearranges them into a heart-warming story of working class aspiration, decency and the belief that whatever the social and economic circumstances talent can be realised". Also "the depth in Elkin's characters adds considerably to the viewer’s empathy for and belief in Spencer as the story unfolds". Sam Gittins' performance as Spencer was also praised: "a role that could easily have become a two-dimensional troubled youth refusing adult help and sulking. Instead Gittins gives a rounded characterisation".

References

External links
 

2020 films
2020 independent films
British independent films
British sports drama films
Snooker films
2020s English-language films
2020s British films